R43 may refer to:

Roads 
 R43 expressway (Czech Republic), now the D43 motorway
 R43 (South Africa)

Other uses 
 , a destroyer of the Royal Navy
 R43: May cause sensitisation by skin contact, a risk phrase
 Small nucleolar RNA R43